Ritipata (possibly from Quechua) is a  mountain in the Apolobamba mountain range in the Andes of Peru. It is located in the Puno Region, Putina Province, Ananea District, as well as in the Sandia Province, Quiaca District. Ritipata is situated south-east of the mountain Vilacota, east of the mountain Ananea and north-west of the mountain Chapi, next to it.

See also 
 Riti Urmasca

References 

Mountains of Peru
Mountains of Puno Region